Forgesia is a genus of flowering plants in the Escalloniaceae family. The genus has one accepted species, Forgesia racemosa.

References

Escalloniaceae
Monotypic asterid genera